Folaga was the name of at least two ships of the Italian Navy and may refer to:

 , Previously merchantile SS Puma purchased in 1916 for use as a patrol boat and discarded in 1920.
 , a  launched in 1942 and stricken in 1965.

Italian Navy ship names